Arnór Atlason (born 23 July 1984) is an Icelandic retired handball player and the current assistant coach of Aalborg Håndbold.

Career
Arnór proved to be one of the best players in his position during the 2008 Olympics, scoring 4 goals against France in the final.

Arnór was the top scorer for Iceland and fourth overall in the 2010 Handball European Championship, with 39 goals out of 66 shots (59%), behind Nikola Karabatic who had 40 goals out of 73 shots (55%). He was also the highest assister with 27 assists out of 8 games, with Nikola Karabatić behind with 25, Ivano Balić and Filip Jícha tied third with 24, however Jícha played two matches less games.

Arnór also had the second highest goals plus assists, with 66 goals created in 8 matches, behind Jícha with 77 out of 6 matches.

Arnór has been regarded as one of the best assisters of this generation, being a key player for the Icelandic national team and AG Copenhagen, often keeping Mikkel Hansen out of his natural position.

References

1984 births
Living people
Icelandic male handball players
Handball players at the 2008 Summer Olympics
Handball players at the 2012 Summer Olympics
Arnor Atlason
Arnor Atlason
Arnor Atlason
Olympic medalists in handball
Medalists at the 2008 Summer Olympics
Árnor Atlason
Knattspyrnufélag Akureyrar handball players
Handball-Bundesliga players
Expatriate handball players
Icelandic expatriates in Denmark
Icelandic expatriates in France
Icelandic expatriates in Germany
SG Flensburg-Handewitt players
Aalborg Håndbold players
SC Magdeburg players